La Habra Heights is a city in Los Angeles County, California, United States. The population was 5,325 at the 2010 census, down from 5,712 at the 2000 census.  La Habra Heights is a suburban canyon community located on the border of Orange and Los Angeles counties. The zoning is  lots with a variety of home and ranch style properties. La Habra Heights features open space and there are no sidewalks in the community. La Habra Heights has no commercial activity (stores, gas stations) with the exception of a small real estate office, a plant nursery, a private golf course and numerous home-based businesses. Hacienda Park is the main park in the city and runs along Hacienda Road. A related city, La Habra, is located south of La Habra Heights and is in Orange County.

Geography
La Habra Heights is located at  (33.964012, -117.952837).

Climate
According to the Köppen Climate Classification system, La Habra Heights has a warm-summer Mediterranean climate, abbreviated "Csa" on climate maps.

Demographics

2010
At the 2010 census La Habra Heights had a population of 5,325. The racial makeup of La Habra Heights was 3,855 (72.4%) White (57.2% Non-Hispanic White), 47 (0.9%) African American, 26 (0.5%) Native American, 841 (15.8%) Asian, 6 (0.1%) Pacific Islander, 333 (6.3%) from other races, and 217 (4.1%) from two or more races. Hispanic or Latino of any race were 1,254 persons (23.5%).

The census reported that 5,305 people (99.6% of the population) lived in households, 14 (0.3%) lived in non-institutionalized group quarters, and 6 (0.1%) were institutionalized.

There were 1,805 households, of which 542 (30.0%) had children under the age of 18 living in them, 1,289 (71.4%) were opposite-sex married couples living together, 123 (6.8%) had a female householder with no husband present, 79 (4.4%) had a male householder with no wife present.  There were 33 (1.8%) unmarried opposite-sex partnerships, and 14 (0.8%) same-sex married couples or partnerships. 253 households (14.0%) were one person and 139 (7.7%) had someone living alone who was 65 or older. The average household size was 2.94.  There were 1,491 families (82.6% of households); the average family size was 3.21.

The age distribution was 1,019 people (19.1%) under the age of 18, 470 people (8.8%) aged 18 to 24, 938 people (17.6%) aged 25 to 44, 1,862 people (35.0%) aged 45 to 64, and 1,036 people (19.5%) who were 65 or older.  The median age was 47.6 years. For every 100 females, there were 99.1 males.  For every 100 females age 18 and over, there were 102.6 males.

There were 1,880 housing units at an average density of 305.1 per square mile, of the occupied units 1,682 (93.2%) were owner-occupied and 123 (6.8%) were rented. The homeowner vacancy rate was 0.5%; the rental vacancy rate was 5.3%.  4,955 people (93.1% of the population) lived in owner-occupied housing units and 350 people (6.6%) lived in rental housing units.

During 2009–2013, La Habra Heights had a median household income of $118,871, with 2.8% of the population living below the federal poverty line.

2000
At the 2000 census there were 5,713 people in 1,887 households, including 1,590 families, in the city. The population density was 922.0 inhabitants per square mile (355.7/km). The racial makeup of the city was 72.41% White, 1.21% Black or African American, 0.33% Native American, 18.40% Asian, 0.11% Pacific Islander, 3.87% from other races, and 3.68% from two or more races.  13.64% of the population were Hispanic or Latino of any race.
Of the 1,887 households, 34.0% had children under the age of 18 living with them, 74.0% were married couples living together, 7.1% had a female householder with no husband present, and 15.7% were non-families. 11.8% of households were one person and 4.8% were one person aged 65 or older.  The average household size was 3.03 and the average family size was 3.29.

The age distribution was 24.5% under the age of 18, 6.8% from 18 to 24, 23.4% from 25 to 44, 30.4% from 45 to 64, and 14.9% 65 or older.  The median age was 42 years. For every 100 females, there were 99.1 males.  For every 100 females age 18 and over, there were 98.2 males.

The median household income was $101,080 and the median family income  was $103,647. Males had a median income of $79,004 versus $41,981 for females. The per capita income for the city was $47,258.  About 2.0% of families and 3.4% of the population were below the poverty line, including 2.7% of those under age 18 and 1.9% of those age 65 or over.

History
La Habra Heights is located on the 1839 Rancho La Habra Mexican land grant made to Mariano Reyes Roldan.  Roldan sold to rancho to Andres Pico who sold it to Abel Stearns.  In 1900, Willits J. Hole acquired , which he sold in 1919 to Edwin G. Hart, who developed La Habra Heights.

Public safety
La Habra Heights has a Combination Fire Department that provides 24/7 365 staffing with full-time (Fire Chief, Deputy Chief, administrative assistant, Fire Captains), part-time (Training Chief, EMS Chief, Fire Captains, & Firefighter Paramedics), and volunteer (Firefighters, Driver Operators) employees housed in fire Station behind City Hall on Hacienda Road. The Fire Department staffs a minimum of two Engines daily with Engine 71 Advanced life support (ALS – with paramedics) and a basic life support (BLS) Engine 72 that provide all hazard all risk response for its citizens. The department does charge several hundred dollars per EMS call, or free for those who pay for and are enrolled in the Paramedic subscription program. A contract with Care Ambulance has one dedicated BLS unit stationed at the Fire Station at all times for patient transport. Additionally the Mutual Aid agreement with Los Angeles County Fire lets LHHFD assist the surrounding communities on an as needed basis. There is an Automatic Aid agreement with a  portion of the west end of La Habra Heights.  Additional firefighting resources can be requested under the Mutual Aid provision of the State of California. La Habra Heights contracts for law enforcement with the Los Angeles County Sheriff's Department's regional station in the City of Industry.

The Los Angeles County Sheriff's Department operates the Industry Station in the City of Industry, serving La Habra Heights.

The Los Angeles County Department of Health Services operates the Whittier Health Center in Whittier, serving La Habra Heights.

Government
La Habra Heights elects a City Council every four years.  One of those City Council members is voted in as Mayor by the Council each year. As of December 10, 2018, the council consists of Mayor Brian Bergman, Mayor Pro Tempore Carey Klingfus, council members Roy Francis, Jane L. Williams, and Norm Zezula.

Education
There are no schools within the La Habra Heights city limits. Students are served by Lowell Joint School District, La Habra City School District and the Fullerton Joint Union High School District, a small portion of the city next to the city of Whittier off west road is zoned to Whittier Union High School District and East Whittier City School District. Students who live west of Hacienda Boulevard are directed to El Portal and Macy Elementary Schools (both in La Habra) and Rancho-Starbuck Intermediate School (in unincorporated East Whittier). Students who live east of Hacienda Boulevard and the small unincorporated section of Los Angeles County north of Arbolita Drive are directed to Walnut, Ladera Vista, El Cerrito and Arbolita Elementary Schools (all in La Habra) and Washington Middle School (in La Habra). Most students who live in La Habra Heights are directed to La Habra High School and Sonora High School (both in La Habra), though a small portion of homes off West Road are zoned to schools in the city of Whittier, which includes La Serna High School, Granada Middle School (in unincorporated East Whittier), and Murphy Ranch Elementary school. Students who live near the border of Hacienda Heights attend schools in the Hacienda La Puente Unified School District.

Parks and recreation
The community has one park "The Park" located on Hacienda Road, which is the center of community events.  The city of La Habra Heights host the annual Avocado Festival. Community organizations such as The La Habra Heights Improvement Association host Music in the Park, Halloween Haunt, Breakfast with Santa, and the Easter Egg Hunt for the community. Highland Riders promote wholesome family equestrian recreation, education, fellowship and sportsmanship.  We work to achieve this by providing equestrian sport and educational activities, and conducting horse shows, trail rides and other riding contests.  There is a gymnasium for basketball, volleyball, and a stage. Also, horse riding arena and practice corral. The Park offers a playground for kids, a Gazebo, and picnic tables.

Newspapers and news organizations
Whittier Daily News
Heights Life
LA Times

References

External links

Cities in Los Angeles County, California
Gateway Cities
Incorporated cities and towns in California
Populated places established in 1978